A Peep Behind the Scenes is a 1918 British silent drama film directed by Kenelm Foss and Geoffrey H. Malins and starring Ivy Close, Gerald Ames and Gertrude Bain. It is an adaptation of the 1877 novel of the same name set around a travelling fair.

Cast
 Ivy Close as Norah Joyce  
 Gerald Ames as Augustus Joyce  
 Gertrude Bain as Lucy Leslie  
 Vera Bryer as Rosalie Joyce  
 Kenneth Gore as Toby Charlton 
 E. Blackton as Mother Manikin

References

External links

1918 films
1918 drama films
British silent feature films
British drama films
Films directed by Kenelm Foss
Films based on British novels
Films set in England
British black-and-white films
1910s English-language films
1910s British films
Silent drama films